Foulk Stapleford is a former civil parish, now in the parish of Hargrave and Huxley, in Cheshire West and Chester, England.  It  contains six buildings that are recorded in the National Heritage List for England as designated listed buildings.  One of these is listed at the middle grade, Grade II*, and the rest at the lowest grade, Grade II.  Apart from the village of Hargrave the parish is entirely rural.  The listed buildings consist of farmhouses and farm buildings, the village church, and a memorial.

Key

Buildings

See also
Listed buildings in Bruen Stapleford
Listed buildings in Burton
Listed buildings in Christleton
Listed buildings in Clotton Hoofield
Listed buildings in Duddon
Listed buildings in Huxley
Listed buildings in Waverton

References
Citations

Sources

Listed buildings in Cheshire West and Chester
Lists of listed buildings in Cheshire